Petar Božić (born December 6, 1978) is a Serbian professional basketball coach and former player. , he is the head coach for the Austin Spurs in the NBA G League. 

During his playing career, he used to play at the point guard–shooting guard position. He was well known for his defense and three-point shooting. He is a Partizan player with the second-most played games (471) in the history of the club, a record that was broken in January 2020 when Novica Veličković surpassed him. He is also a part of the Partizan Belgrade supporters All-decade Team.

Playing career
Before coming to Partizan, Božić was a little-known player. He started his professional career in KK Beobanka, playing there for three years. He then played for the club Radnički Jugopetrol. He stayed there for just one season (2000–01). The last club he played for before Partizan was Hemofarm Vršac. After three seasons in Hemofarm, the team recommended him to Partizan.

Božić was signed by the Partizan Belgrade in 2004 at the beginning of the season. In the same season he won the Serbian Super League with the club. Years spent captaining the club, he became club legend with the most appearances (471 games played) for the club ever in history; record was broken in January 2020 after Novica Veličković surpassed him. He has won over 17 trophies with Partizan and is dubbed by the Partizan fans as a "professional trophy lifter".

Coaching career
Following his retirement from the professional basketball, he was named an assistant coach of Duško Vujošević in Partizan back in 2013. After Partizan decided not to extend a contract with Vujošević, Božić was named the new head coach of the team in September 2015. On January 5, 2016, he parted ways with the team after 6–12 record in the ABA League.

In October 2017, Božić was hired by the Austin Spurs to be an assistant coach. In 2021, he was promoted to the head coaching position.

References

External links

 Petar Božić at eurobasket.com

1978 births
Living people
ABA League players
Austin Spurs coaches
Basketball League of Serbia players
KK Beobanka players
KK Hemofarm players
KK Metalac Valjevo players
KK Partizan coaches
KK Partizan players
Point guards
BKK Radnički players
Serbian expatriate basketball people in the United States
Serbian men's basketball coaches
Serbian men's basketball players
Shooting guards
Basketball players from Belgrade